Dagoberto Rodríguez (1912–1974) was a Mexican film actor.

Selected filmography
 The Player (1953)
 The Bandits of Cold River (1956)
 Black Skull (1960)
 Romance in Puerto Rico (1962)

References

Bibliography
 Joaquín Garcia. Historia del Cine Puertorriqueo. Palibrio, 2014.

External links

1912 births
1974 deaths
Mexican male film actors
Male actors from Aguascalientes
20th-century Mexican male actors